Laredo is the city capital of Laredo District located 9 km from Trujillo, in La Libertad Region, Peru.

History
The population of Laredo grew and the authorities asked President Alan Garcia to enact Law No. 25253, which was passed on June 19, 1990, giving Laredo the policy rank of a city, and extending its boundaries.

Education
 Technological Institute of Laredo, It provides education in careers of accounting, nursing and computer science. It is located in Los Laureles avenue of Laredo city.

Economy
The city is located in a valley with high agricultura production of sugar cane. Near the city is located the agro industrial company Sol de Laredo, which produces sugar and its derivates.

Festivals
 Carnival of Conache

Tourism
 Lake Conache, located close to the town Conache.

See also
 Trujillo
 Trujillo Province
 La Libertad Region
 Laredo District
 Lake Conache

References

External links
 Location of Laredo city (Wikimapia)
 Municipality of Laredo

Cities in La Libertad Region
Localities of Trujillo, Peru
Populated places in La Libertad Region